You Wenhui (born October 20, 1979 in Shanghai) is a female Chinese beach volleyball player who competed in the 2004 Summer Olympics.

In 2004 she was eliminated with her teammate Wang Lu in the first round of the women's beach volleyball competition.

References

External links
 
 

1979 births
Living people
Chinese female beach volleyball players
Beach volleyball players at the 2004 Summer Olympics
Olympic beach volleyball players of China
Beach volleyball players at the 2002 Asian Games
Asian Games medalists in beach volleyball
Volleyball players from Shanghai
Asian Games silver medalists for China
Medalists at the 2002 Asian Games